Ajax was a  74-gun ship of the line of the French Navy.

Career 
Ajax was built at Rochefort along the lines of the Téméraire type designed by Jacques-Noël Sané, but with modifications brought by Engineers Rigault and Filhol; she is sometimes listed as a "82-gun ship".

Commissioned under Captain Jean-Nicolas Petit, she replaced Jemmapes in Zacharie Allemand's squadron. In 1808, she transferred to Toulon, where she became an artillery hulk in 1815. 

Renamed Patiente in 1816, she became a prison hulk in 1818.

Notes, citations, and references
Notes

Citations

References

Ships of the line of the French Navy
Téméraire-class ships of the line
1791 ships
Maritime incidents in 1793